The Secret Agent Club is a 1996 American spy action comedy film starring Hulk Hogan and directed by John Murlowski. The film is about a secret spy (Hulk Hogan) who steals a laser gun and pretends that it is a toy but gets in deep trouble when the people find out who he stole the gun from.

Plot
When Ray Chase, an agent so secret even his son doesn't know, brings home a high-powered laser gun he stole, the theft victim sends her henchmen to capture Ray and get the gun back. But Ray's son escapes with the gun and then devises a plan to rescue his dad.

Cast

Release

Home media
The film was released direct-to-video on August 16, 1996.

Platinum Disc was released on DVD on February 8, 2005.

References

External links
 The Secret Agent Club at the Internet Movie Database

1996 films
1996 independent films
1996 action comedy films
1990s spy comedy films
American action comedy films
American independent films
American spy comedy films
Films directed by John Murlowski
Sonar Entertainment films
1990s English-language films
1990s American films